Ivan Petrov may refer to:

 Ivan Petrov (ataman) (16th century), Cossack ataman, Russian explorer of China and Mongolia
 Ivan Atanassov Petrov (born 1947), Bulgarian neurologist
 Ivan Fyodorovich Petrov (1897—1994), Soviet Air Force general, head of the Central Aerohydrodynamic Institute (1940-1941) and  Flight Research Institute (1947-1951), first rector of the Moscow Institute of Physics and Technology (1952-1962)
 Ivan Georgiev Petrov (born 1949), Bulgarian-American physicist, past president of American Vacuum Society
 Ivan Yefimovich Petrov (1896–1958), Soviet army general
 Ivan Ivanovich Petrov (1920–2003), Russian bass singer